Branko Kovačević (born 27 February 1967) is a Serbian volleyball coach. He is currently the head coach of Olympiacos Piraeus women's volleyball team and the assistant coach of Serbia women's national volleyball team.

International career
Branko Kovačević was the assistant coach of the Serbian women's national volleyball team who won the Olympic silver medal at Rio 2016, and the 2011 CEV Volleyball European Championship at Belgrade as well.

Club career
Under his guidance, Olympiacos Piraeus have won 3 Hellenic Championships (2015–16, 2016–17, 2017-18), 3 Hellenic Cups (2016, 2017, 2018) and the CEV Women's Challenge Cup in 2017–18. The Piraeus team also reached the final of the same competition in 2016–17.

Honours

Head coach

European
CEV Women's Challenge Cup
  Winner: 2017-18 with Olympiacos Piraeus
  Runner-up: 2016-17 with Olympiacos Piraeus

Domestic
 2015/2016  Hellenic Championship (Women's), with Olympiacos Piraeus
 2016/2017  Hellenic Championship (Women's), with Olympiacos Piraeus
 2017/2018  Hellenic Championship (Women's), with Olympiacos Piraeus
 2018/2019  Hellenic Championship (Women's), with Olympiacos Piraeus
 2015/2016  Hellenic Cup (Women's), with Olympiacos Piraeus
 2016/2017  Hellenic Cup (Women's), with Olympiacos Piraeus
 2017/2018  Hellenic Cup (Women's), with Olympiacos Piraeus
 2018/2019  Hellenic Cup (Women's), with Olympiacos Piraeus

Assistant coach
 2016 Olympic Games -  Silver Medal
 2011 Women's European Volleyball Championship -  Golden Medal

References

External links
 Branko Kovačević profile at worldofvolley.com
 An amazing presence in the CEV Challenge Cup! (Silver Medal with Olympiacos in 2017 Challenge Cup) www.olympiacossfp.gr
 The Triumph in Bursa in 2018 www.olympiacossfp.gr

1967 births
Living people
Serbian volleyball coaches
Olympiacos Women's Volleyball coaches